David J. Kostelancik is an American diplomat who is the nominee to be the United States ambassador to Albania.

Early life, education and personal life 

A native of Illinois, Kostelancik earned a Master of Science from the National War College in national security policy. He also received a Master of Arts from the University of Michigan in Russian and East European studies and a Bachelor of Arts from Northwestern University in mathematics and political science. He speaks Russian, Hungarian, Albanian and Turkish.

Career 

Kostelancik is a career member of the Senior Foreign Service with the rank of minister-counselor. Early in his career, Kostelancik was posted twice to the U.S. Embassy in Moscow, Russia. Other overseas postings include the U.S. Mission to the Organization for Security and Co-operation in Europe (OSCE) and the U.S. Mission to the North Atlantic Treaty Organization (NATO), the U.S. embassy in Tirana, Albania and the U.S. embassy in Ankara, Turkey. Other assignments include director of the Office of South Central European Affairs and director of the Office of Russian Affairs, both in the Bureau of European and Eurasian Affairs, as well as director of the Office of Europe and Asia in the Bureau of International Narcotics and Law Enforcement Affairs. He previously served as deputy chief of Mission, and for two years, as Chargé d'affaires, ad interim at the U.S. embassy in Budapest, Hungary. Since August 2021, he serves as foreign policy advisor to Chairman of the Joint Chiefs of Staff, General Mark Milley.

Nomination as ambassador to Albania 
On January 23, 2023, President Joe Biden nominated Kostelancik to serve as the  United States ambassador to Albania. His nomination is pending before the Senate Foreign Relations Committee.

References

Living people
21st-century American diplomats
People from Illinois
National War College alumni
Northwestern University alumni
United States Department of State officials
United States Foreign Service personnel
University of Michigan alumni
Year of birth missing (living people)
Place of birth missing (living people)